Kälarne is a locality situated in Bräcke Municipality, Jämtland County, Sweden with 451 inhabitants in 2010.

References 

Populated places in Bräcke Municipality
Jämtland